Iswar Chandra Vidyasagar College, (formerly known as Belonia College), established in 22nd May, 1964, is one of the oldest college in South Tripura. It offers undergraduate courses in arts, commerce and science. It is affiliated to  Tripura University.

Departments

Science
Chemistry
Physics
Mathematics
Statistics
Botany
Zoology
Physiology
Environmental Science

Arts 
Bengali
English
Sanskrit
History
Geography
Political Science
Philosophy
Education
Economics
Physical Education
NCC

Commerce 
Business Study
Accountancy

Faculties (Alumni) 

Dr. Pinaki Maiti
Sri Manab Debbarma
Dr. Niranjan Das
Sri Saisab Das 
Smt Sevika Debbarma
Sri Sanjoy Chakraborty
Sri Tapesh Ranjan Chakraborty
Sri Rajib Lal Debbarma
Dr. Moujuri Bhowmik 
Dr. Chandrani Debbarma
Sri Rabindra Shukla Das
Sri Manish Prasad
Dr. Biswajit Baidya
Sri Swarup Bhattacharjee
Dr. Parasmita Sarkar 
Sri Dalim Das
Sri Vanlalrema Kuki
Smt Subra Sarkar
Sri Punasish Datta
Sri Sibram Debnath
Sri Sribash Mallik
Smt Nandita Sen Choudhury 
Sri Tapan Kumar Roy
Sri Dilip Kumar Biswas
Sri Nitai Choudhury
Sri Dilip Kumar Sen
Smt Mausumi Sen
Smt Papri Sen
Smt Mausumi Majumder
Sri Nasir Uddin Bhuiya
Sri Sribas Dey
Dr. Sutapa Das
Sri Dilip Mazumder 
Smt Gouri Saha
Sri Santosh Majumder
Dr. Mohammad Hussain Khan 
Dr. Manoranjan Das (Principal)
Smt Aaditi Karmakar
Smt Nhang Thwi Mog
Sri Anup Nandy
Smt Rinki Paul
Smt Rakhi Aktar Majumder 
Sri Akash Paul
Smt Chandana Tripura
Sri Rajesh Debnath
Sri Sukanta Das 
Sri Nandan Debnath 
Sri Akash Tripura
Smt Aparna Acharjee
Sri Sabuj Bhowmik
Sri Animesh Majumder
Smt Susmita Biswas
Smt Aparna Deb
Sri Rajesh Malla
Smt Kulsum Bibi
Sri Sadhan Das
Dr. Aparna Nath 
Smt Sangita Bhowmik
Sri Sumit Majumder
Sri Amit Tripura
Smt Punam Singha
Dr. Rousan Ali
Dr. Dipankar Majumdar 
Sri Bijoy Krishna Das 
Sri Prankrishna Debnath
Sri Gajendra Bhadkariya
Sri Pranjit Ray
Sri Parimal Chandra Nath 
Dr. Kuldip Gosai
Dr. Prabir Bhowmik
Dr. Prasenjit Debbarma
Dr. Rahul Bhattacharjee
Dr. Shubhranil Brahma
Sri Tapas Sarkar
Dr. Chiranjit Paul

Accreditation
The college is recognized by the University Grants Commission (UGC).

References

Colleges affiliated to Tripura University
Educational institutions established in 1964
Universities and colleges in Tripura
1964 establishments in Tripura
Colleges in Tripura